Raimund G. Seidel is a German and Austrian theoretical computer scientist and an expert in computational geometry.

Seidel was born in Graz, Austria, and studied with Hermann Maurer at the Graz University of Technology. He received his M. Sc. in 1981 from University of British Columbia under David G. Kirkpatrick. He received his Ph.D. in 1987 from Cornell University under the supervision of John Gilbert. After teaching at the University of California, Berkeley, he moved in 1994 to Saarland University. In 1997 he and Christoph M. Hoffmann were program chairs for the Symposium on Computational Geometry. In 2014, he took over as Scientific Director of the Leibniz Center for Informatics (LZI) from Reinhard Wilhelm.

Seidel invented backwards analysis of randomized algorithms and used it to analyze a simple linear programming algorithm that runs in linear time for problems of bounded dimension. With his student Cecilia R. Aragon in 1989 he devised the treap data structure, and he is also known for the Kirkpatrick–Seidel algorithm for computing two-dimensional convex hulls.

References

External links

Year of birth missing (living people)
Living people
Austrian computer scientists
German computer scientists
Researchers in geometric algorithms
Cornell University alumni
University of California, Berkeley faculty